Nona Moselle Conner (December 12, 1983  May 13, 2021) was a Washington, D.C.-based activist for the rights of sex workers, women of color and transgender women.

Career
She was a member of the Collective Action for Safe Spaces (an anti-street harassment nonprofit) after being introduced to its executive director, Jessica Raven, by a friend at Whitman-Walker Health. Since 2016, she had a paid position at CASS. She was an organizer of CASS's DecrimNow campaign, which aimed to decriminalize sex work.

Personal life
Conner described herself as a "triple minority": black, gay and transgender. 

Conner had previously been stabbed 48 times by a man in what was a suspected anti-transgender hate crime, after she rejected his request to give him oral sex. She had previously suffered housing insecurity, financial instability, and was previously involved in sex work.

Conner died on May 13, 2021.

References

Further reading
A Tribute to Our Beloved Nona (1983 – 2021), by Je'Kendria Trahan of Collective Action D.C.

1983 births
2021 deaths
Violence against trans women
Transgender women
LGBT African Americans
LGBT people from Washington, D.C.
People from Washington, D.C.
Women in Washington, D.C.